The SPARCstation 1 (Sun 4/60, code-named Campus) is the first of the SPARCstation series of SPARC-based computer workstations sold by Sun Microsystems. The design originated in 1987 by a Sun spin-off company, Unisun, which was soon re-acquired. The SPARCstation 1 has a distinctive slim enclosure (a square 3-inch-high "pizza box") and was first sold in April 1989, with Sun's support ending in 1995.

Based on a LSI Logic RISC CPU running at 20 MHz, with a Weitek 3170 (or 3172) FPU coprocessor, it was the fourth Sun computer (after the 4/260, 4/110 and 4/280) to use the SPARC architecture and the first of the sun4c architecture. The motherboard offered three SBus slots and had built-in AUI Ethernet, 8 kHz audio, and a 5 MB/s SCSI-1 bus. The basic display ran at 1152×900 in 256 colours, and monitors shipped with the computer were 16 to 19 inch greyscale or colour.

Designed for ease of production to compete with high-end PCs or Macs (its principal competitors were the IBM PS/2 Model 80, the NeXT Computer, and Sun's own 3/80), it sold for between about US$9,000 (with no hard disks), to US$20,000 — and in the first year around 35,000 units were sold.

Design 
The SPARCstation 1 features several distinctive design and packaging elements driven internally by system designer Andy Bechtolsheim and externally by design house frog design. Bechtolsheim specified that the motherboard would be the size of a sheet of paper and the SBus expansion cards would be the size of index cards, resulting in an extremely compact footprint. The external design motif includes dot-patterned cooling vents on the side which are echoed by a "dimple" pattern on the front face, and "Sun purple" feet.

Memory 
The SPARCstation 1 takes 30-pin SIMMs in groups of four. It can take either 1 MB or 4 MB SIMMs as long as the size is consistent within a bank. 
There are a total of four memory banks, which can give a total of 64 MB of memory. Memory bank 0 (composed of U0311, U0322, U0309, and U0307) should be filled first. If not, the OpenBoot firmware will hang while memory checking.

Disk drives 
The SPARCstation 1 has space for up to two hard drives and one floppy drive internally. The machine will take any 50-pin SCSI-2 hard drive, but the OpenBoot firmware will not boot from any partition which starts or ends after 1024 MB.
The floppy drive, like the Macintosh's, is unusual in that it has an electromechanical eject mechanism rather than the conventional eject button, and therefore must be ejected by the operating system or OpenBoot. 
The machine can connect to any SCSI CD drive, via either the SCSI connector on the back or by connecting it to any spare internal SCSI connector via a 50-pin cable.

Network support 

The SPARCstation 1 comes with an on-board AMD Lance Ethernet chipset and a 15-pin AUI connector, which can connect to 10BASE2, 10BASE5 or 10BASE-T via an appropriate transceiver. The OpenBoot ROM is able to boot from network, using RARP and TFTP. Like all other SPARCstation systems, the SPARCstation 1 holds system information such as MAC address and host id (serial number) in NVRAM. If the battery on this chip dies, then the system will not be able to boot.

NVRAM 
The SPARCstation 1 uses an M48T02 battery-backed RTC with RAM chip which handles the real time clock and boot parameter storage. A problem with this chip is that the battery is internal, which means the entire chip must be replaced when its battery runs out. As all SPARCstation 1s made are now older than the battery life of this chip, a substantial number of these systems now refuse to boot.  Additionally, the SPARCstation 1 design used the reserved bits in the M48T02's NVRAM in a non-standard way; since later revisions of the M48T02 chip exert stricter control over these bits, a current M48T02 will store the NVRAM data, but the RTC will not function correctly and the system may fail to auto-boot.

Due to incompatibilities with modern M48T02s, it is common to modify failed NVRAMs by cutting into the encapsulation and patching in a new battery. It is also possible to replace the entire encapsulation, which also contains a 32.768 KHz clock crystal.

Operating systems 
The SPARCstation 1, 1+, IPC and SLC can run the following operating systems:
 SunOS 4.0.3c through 5.7 (Solaris 7)
 Linux (Modern versions may have trouble with the limited amount of memory in these machines)
 NetBSD 1.0 onwards
 OpenBSD - All versions up to 5.9 (OpenBSD 5.9 was the last release to support SPARC32)

Notable uses 
 Four or five SPARCstation 1 units were used by Game Freak to develop Pokémon Red and Green.

Related computers 

The SPARCstation 1+ (Sun 4/65) pushed the CPU to a 25 MHz LSI L64801, upgraded the coprocessor to a Weitek 3172 and installed a new SCSI controller.

The SPARCstation IPC (Sun 4/40) is a version of the SPARCstation 1+ in a lunchbox style case and onboard video.

The SPARCstation SLC (Sun 4/20) is a version of the SPARCstation 1+ built into a monitor cabinet.

The SPARCstation 2 (Sun 4/75) is the machine's successor and was released in November 1990.

References

External links
 SUN NVRAM FAQ
 
 

Sun workstations
SPARC microprocessor products